Qianmen station is a station on Line 2 and Line 8 of the Beijing Subway located near Qianmen.

Station layout 
Both the line 2 and line 8 stations have island platforms.

Exits 
There are three exits, lettered A, B, and C. Exit A is accessible.

References

External links

Railway stations in China opened in 1971
Beijing Subway stations in Dongcheng District